Sergio Muscardin (born 27 October 1956) is a former Italian male long-distance runner who competed at one edition of the IAAF World Cross Country Championships at senior level (1976),

References

External links
 Sergio Muscardin profile at Association of Road Racing Statisticians

1956 births
Living people
Italian male long-distance runners
Italian male cross country runners